David Møller Wolfe (born 23 April 2002) is a Norwegian football defender who plays as a left back for SK Brann.

He started his career in Bergen Nord, playing on the senior team in 2017, 2018 and 2019 before joining the junior team of SK Brann in the summer of 2019. The same year he became a Norway youth international player. In 2020 Wolfe was loaned out to Åsane for the entire season. In 2021 he signed a three-year contract with Brann. He made his Eliteserien debut in May 2021 against Viking, as a left winger.

References

2002 births
Living people
Footballers from Bergen
Norwegian footballers
SK Brann players
Åsane Fotball players
Norwegian First Division players
Eliteserien players
Association football defenders
Norway youth international footballers